San Andreas Lake is a reservoir adjacent to the San Francisco Peninsula cities of Millbrae and San Bruno in San Mateo County, California.  It is situated directly on the San Andreas Fault, which is named after the valley it is in.

History 
After discovering San Francisco Bay from Sweeney Ridge on November 4, 1769, the Portolá expedition descended what Portolà called the Cañada de San Francisco, now San Andreas Creek, to camp in the vicinity of today's San Andreas Lake.

The next day they reached a "Laguna Grande" which today is covered by the Upper Crystal Springs Reservoir. The campsite is marked by California Historical Marker No. 94 "Portola Expedition Camp", located at Crystal Springs Dam, on Skyline Boulevard, 0.1 mi south of Crystal Springs Road. They camped here a second time on November 12, on their return trip.

Padre Palóu, on an expedition from Monterey to explore the western side of San Francisco Bay led by Captain Fernando Rivera y Moncada, renamed Portola's Cañada de San Francisco to Cañada de San Andrés on November 30, 1774, it being the feast day of St. Andrew.

Captain Juan Bautista de Anza, after forging the first overland route from Monterey, California to San Francisco Bay, explored the peninsula and selected the sites for Mission San Francisco de Asís (Mission Dolores) and the Presidio of San Francisco. De Anza returned to Monterey via the Cañada de San Andrés and camped on the banks of San Mateo Creek on March 29, 1776. In de Anza's diary on March 29, 1776, he wrote: "Night having fallen, at a quarter past six I went down to the arroyo of San Andreas and to another, that of San Matheo, where it descends to empty into the estuary..."

Description
Originally a small natural sag pond, the lake was expanded by the construction of a 100 foot high earth dam in 1868. The dam survived the 1906 earthquake despite the fact that the fault runs directly under the dam.

In 1895, Professor Andrew Lawson of the University of California, Berkeley, conferred the name of the lake on the earthquake fault he discovered in its vicinity.

Ecology
Construction of the 1868 dam would have trapped salmonids such as coho salmon (Oncorhynchus kisutch) and coastal rainbow trout (Oncorhynchus mykiss irideus) as both stream resident and steelhead life forms, both known to have been historically present in the San Mateo Creek watershed. San Mateo Creek once hosted coho salmon as evidenced by specimens collected by Professor Alexander Agassiz of Harvard University in the 1850s and 1860s. The historical presence of coho salmon is also suggested in an 1877 description by Charles Hallock: "Pilarcitos, one of the Spring Valley Water Company's reservoirs, is now well filled with fair-sized trout, and San Andreas, chiefly with silver salmon of generally moderate size".

Public access 
Since the lake is a public water source, it is closed to the public.  However, hikers and bicyclists may travel along the eastern shores of the lake on a paved trail that runs just west of Skyline Boulevard from San Bruno Avenue to Millbrae Avenue.  A connecting trail, called the Sawyer Camp Trail, crosses the rift valley on the San Andreas Dam.  This 6 mile (10 km) trail eventually reaches the eastern shores of the Lower Crystal Springs reservoir and the Crystal Springs Dam.

See also 
 List of lakes in California
 List of lakes in the San Francisco Bay Area

References

External links 
 
 San Andreas Lake (USGS) 
 San Andreas Fault in the Bay Area (Stanford)

Reservoirs in San Mateo County, California
Hetch Hetchy Project
San Bruno, California
Reservoirs in California
Reservoirs in Northern California